The 1992–93 daytime network television schedule for the four major English-language commercial broadcast networks in the United States covers the weekday and weekend daytime hours from September 1992 to August 1993.

Legend

 New series are highlighted in bold.

Schedule
 All times correspond to U.S. Eastern and Pacific Time scheduling (except for some live sports or events). Except where affiliates slot certain programs outside their network-dictated timeslots, subtract one hour for Central, Mountain, Alaska, and Hawaii-Aleutian times.
 Local schedules may differ, as affiliates have the option to pre-empt or delay network programs. Such scheduling may be limited to preemptions caused by local or national breaking news or weather coverage (which may force stations to tape delay certain programs in overnight timeslots or defer them to a co-operated station or digital subchannel in their regular timeslot) and any major sports events scheduled to air in a weekday timeslot (mainly during major holidays). Stations may air shows at other times at their preference.

Monday–Friday

ABC note: After ABC cut Home back to one hour, giving the noon/11am timeslot back to local stations, Loving became available to affiliates at noon/11am CT/PT to allow stations to air newscasts in the 11:30am timeslot in the Central, Mountain and Pacific time zones.

NBC note: Santa Barbara aired its final episode on January 15, 1993. The following Monday, NBC returned the 3 pm timeslot to its local stations. Many affiliates had already dropped the show by the time it was canceled. In exchange, NBC took back the 12:00 p.m. timeslot from its local stations. Many affiliates did not air network programming in the 12:00 p.m. timeslot, opting to air local news or other programming.

CBS note: CBS returned the 10 am hour to its affiliates beginning September 13.

Saturday

Sunday

By network

ABC

Returning series:
ABC Weekend Special
ABC World News This Morning
ABC World News Tonight with Peter Jennings
All My Children
The Bugs Bunny and Tweety Show
Darkwing Duck
General Hospital
Good Morning America
Home
Land of the Lost
Loving
The New Adventures of Winnie the Pooh 
One Life to Live
A Pup Named Scooby-Doo 
Schoolhouse Rock! 
This Week with David Brinkley

New series:
The Addams Family
Goof Troop
Wild West C.O.W.-Boys of Moo Mesa

Not returning from 1991-92:
Beetlejuice
Hammerman
The Pirates of Dark Water
Slimer! and the Real Ghostbusters

CBS

Returning series:
As the World Turns
Back to the Future
The Bold and the Beautiful
CBS Evening News
CBS Morning News
CBS News Sunday Morning
CBS This Morning
Face the Nation
Family Feud Challenge
Garfield and Friends
Guiding Light
Mother Goose and Grimm (retitled Grimmy)
The Price Is Right
Teenage Mutant Ninja Turtles
The Young and the Restless

New series:
The Amazing Live Sea Monkeys
Cyber C.O.P.S.
The Little Mermaid
Raw Toonage
Fievel's American Tails

Not returning from 1991-92:
Designing Women 
Family Feud
Inspector Gadget 
Jim Henson's Muppet Babies
Riders in the Sky
Where's Waldo?

Fox

Returning series:
Alvin and the Chipmunks 
Beetlejuice 
Bobby's World
George of the Jungle 
Merrie Melodies Starring Bugs Bunny & Friends 
Mighty Mouse: The New Adventures 
Taz-Mania
Tiny Toon Adventures
Tom & Jerry Kids

New series:
Batman: The Animated Series
Dog City
Eek! The Cat
The Plucky Duck Show
Super Dave: Daredevil for Hire
X-Men

Not returning from 1991-92:
Attack of the Killer Tomatoes
Bill & Ted's Excellent Adventures
Jim Henson's Muppet Babies 
Little Dracula (limited series)
Little Shop
Fox's Peter Pan & the Pirates

NBC

Returning series:
Another World
Classic Concentration 
Days of Our Lives
Dr. Dean
The Faith Daniels Show
Meet the Press
NBA Inside Stuff
NBC News at Sunrise
NBC Nightly News
Santa Barbara
Saturday Today
Saved by the Bell
Scrabble
Today

New series:
Brains and Brawn
Caesars Challenge
California Dreams
Double Up
Family Secrets
John and Leeza from Hollywood
Name Your Adventure
Scattergories

Not returning from 1991-92:
Captain N: The Game Master
Chip and Pepper's Cartoon Madness
A Closer Look
One on One with John Tesh
ProStars
Saturday Morning Videos
Space Cats
Super Mario World
Wish Kid
Yo Yogi!

See also
1992-93 United States network television schedule (prime-time)
1992-93 United States network television schedule (late night)

Sources
https://web.archive.org/web/20071015122215/http://curtalliaume.com/abc_day.html
https://web.archive.org/web/20071015122235/http://curtalliaume.com/cbs_day.html
https://web.archive.org/web/20071012211242/http://curtalliaume.com/nbc_day.html
https://kidsblockblog.wordpress.com/2012/10/25/fox-kids-weekday-lineups-1990-1993/

United States weekday network television schedules
1992 in American television
1993 in American television